"Don't Talk Dirty to Me" is a song by American singer Jermaine Stewart, released as the third single in 1988 from his third studio album Say It Again. The song was written by Stewart and André Cymone, and produced by Cymone.

Although not a hit in America, "Don't Talk Dirty to Me" saw some commercial success in Europe. It was Stewart's biggest hit in Germany, peaking at #4, and also reaching #14 in Switzerland. Despite the success of the previous two singles from Say It Again, "Don't Talk Dirty to Me" failed to make the UK Top 40, peaking at #61, and lasting on the chart for three weeks.

Unlike the previous Say It Again singles, no promotional video was filmed for the single. However, Stewart did perform the song on the German show Peters Pop Show, Soul Train, as well as the American police drama Miami Vice.

The B-Side for the single "Places" was exclusive to the single, written by Stewart and Roy Carter. It later appeared on the 2005 compilation Attention: A Tribute to Jermaine Stewart. For the single, various remixes of "Don't Talk Dirty to Me" were released along with the CD single track "Get Lucky (New York Mix)" which is a remix of Stewart's previous single.

Formats
7" Single
"Don't Talk Dirty to Me" - 4:40
"Places" - 4:26

12" Single (American/Canadian release)
"Don't Talk Dirty To Me (Extended Dance Version)" - 8:56
"Don't Talk Dirty To Me (Dub Version)" - 4:20
"Don't Talk Dirty To Me (Single Version)" - 4:06
"Don't Talk Dirty To Me (Extended Dance Edit)" - 6:13
"Places" - 4:26

12" Single (European release)
"Don't Talk Dirty To Me (Extended Remix)" - 8:56
"Don't Talk Dirty To Me (Dub)" - 4:20
"Places" - 4:26

CD Single
"Don't Talk Dirty To Me (Radio Edit)" - 4:05
"Don't Talk Dirty To Me (Remix Edit)" - 6:13
"Get Lucky (New York Mix)" - 4:04
"Places" - 4:26

Chart performance

Personnel 
 Sleeve Design – Bill Smith Studio
 Photography – Christof Gstalder
 Additional Producers, Remixers on "Don't Talk Dirty to Me" – Phil Harding & Ian Curnow
 Producer on "Don't Talk Dirty to Me" – André Cymone
 Producer on "Places" - Roy Carter
 Engineer on "Places" - Peter Rackham
 Remixers on "Get Lucky (New York Mix)" - Phil Harding & Ian Curnow
 Producers on "Get Lucky (New York Mix)" - Aaron Zigman, Jerry Knight 
 Writers of "Don't Talk Dirty to Me" – André Cymone, Jermaine Stewart 
 Writers of "Places" – Jermaine Stewart, Roy Carter
 Writers of "Get Lucky" – Errol Brown, Simon Climie

References

1988 singles
Jermaine Stewart songs
Songs written by André Cymone
Songs written by Jody Watley
1987 songs
Virgin Records singles